Anorthoa is a moth genus in the family Noctuidae.

Species
 Anorthoa angustipennis (Monima, 1926)
 Anorthoa fabiani (Hreblay & Ronkay, 1998)
 Anorthoa munda – twin-spotted Quaker (Denis & Schiffermüller, 1775)
 Anorthoa rubrocinerea (Hreblay & Ronkay, 1998)

References
 Anorthoa at Markku Savela's Lepidoptera and Some Other Life Forms
 Natural History Museum Lepidoptera genus database

Orthosiini
Noctuoidea genera